Silvain Vanot (born 1963) is a French singer-songwriter. He has issued seven albums and also composes film music.

Egérie (1997).

References

1963 births
Living people